This list is a sublist of List of irregularly spelled English names.

List

Notes

References

Irregularly spelled United States
Irregularly spelled